Robert J. McNeill (born October 22, 1938) is an American former professional basketball player. He played in the National Basketball Association (NBA) from 1960 to 1962.

McNeill was born near 2nd & Allegheny in the Kensington section of Philadelphia, Pennsylvania. As a senior at North Catholic High School, McNeill once scored 46 points in a game, which is an all-time school record. He was selected as a 1st team All-Catholic player in 1956. As the team's point guard, McNeill led the 1956 Falcons basketball team to a Philadelphia Catholic League Championship, scoring 14 points in a one-point victory over La Salle. He then led the Falcons to their first ever City Basketball Championship Title by beating West Philadelphia. In the city title game, McNeill scored 29 points in a 68–67 victory at the Palestra.
	
McNeill then went on to play collegiately for the St. Joseph's Hawks. He led the team to the NCAA tournament in 1959 and 1960. He was named first-team All-Big 5 in 1958, 1959 and 1960 while he also earned All-American honors as a senior. Upon graduating, McNeill held the St. Joseph's record for assists in a game, a season, and a career. He still owns school record for free throws made and attempted in a game. He was inducted into the St Joseph's Athletic Hall of Fame in 2001.

He was drafted in the 3rd round by the New York Knicks in the 1960 NBA draft. He played guard during the course of his NBA career and played for the New York Knicks, Philadelphia Warriors and Los Angeles Lakers. He averaged 5 points and 3 assists per game in his NBA career. He played in 5 games for the Lakers in the 1962 NBA Finals loss to the Boston Celtics.

In 1963 McNeill joined the Eastern Pennsylvania Basketball League (EPBL) and played alongside Paul Arizin for the Camden Bullets from 1962 until 1966. McNeill helped the Bullets win the 1964 Eastern League Championship where he averaged 20 points per game.  He continued to play professional basketball with the Trenton Colonials of the Eastern Basketball League (EBL) in 1967 before finishing up with the Allentown Jets in 1969.

References

External links
Career statistics

1938 births
Living people
Allentown Jets players
American men's basketball players
Camden Bullets players
Los Angeles Lakers players
New York Knicks draft picks
New York Knicks players
Philadelphia Warriors players
Point guards
Saint Joseph's Hawks men's basketball players
Basketball players from Philadelphia